Jersey is an island country in the English Channel.

Jersey may also refer to:

Common meanings
Jersey (clothing), a garment
Jersey (fabric), a knit
Jersey cattle

Places in the United States

Geography
Jersey City, New Jersey, a city
Jersey, Arkansas, an unincorporated community
Jersey, Georgia, a town
Jersey, Ohio, an unincorporated community
Jersey Village, Texas, a city
Jersey, Virginia, an unincorporated community
Jersey County, Illinois, a county
Jersey Island (California), an island
Jersey Township, Jersey County, Illinois, a township
Jersey Township, Licking County, Ohio, a township
New Jersey, a state sometimes referred to as Jersey
Jersey Shore, a region of that state
Jersey Shore, Pennsylvania, an inland borough

Bridges
 Jersey Bridge (Cherrytree Township, Pennsylvania), listed on the NRHP in Venango County (as "Bridge in Cherrytree Township")
 Jersey Bridge, in Downieville, California, listed on the National Register of Historic Places (NRHP) in Sierra County

People
Paul de Jersey (born 1948), Governor of Queensland, Australia, jurist and former Chief Justice of the Supreme Court of Queensland
 Earl of Jersey, a title in the Peerage of England and a list of bearers of the title
 Lady Jersey (disambiguation), countesses of Jersey

Arts, entertainment, and media
Jersey (band), a musical group
Jersey (EP), an EP by Bella Thorne
The Jersey, a 1999 television series
Jersey (2019 film), a Telugu film
Jersey (2022 film), a Hindi film
Jersey Shore (TV series), US comedy TV show
Jersey Boys, a 2005 Broadway musical

Military
Battle of Jersey, a 1781 attempt to capture the island during the American Revolutionary War
HMS Jersey, several Royal Navy ships

Sports
Jersey Open, a European Tour golf tournament from 1978 to 1995
Jersey Stakes, Group 3 flat horse race in Great Britain

Other uses
Jersey barrier, a traffic control device
Project Jersey, a software framework for developing web services in Java

See also